Jason Lester Williams (born 5 September 1976) is a former Kittitian cricketer who played for the Leeward Islands in West Indian domestic cricket. He was a wicket-keeper who batted right-handed.

Williams made his first-class debut for the Leeward Islands in January 1999, playing against Jamaica in the 1998–99 Busta Cup. He continued to make irregular appearances for the team into the mid-2000s, with his last matches for the team coming in the 2006–07 KFC Cup. Beginning with the 2001–02 Red Stripe Bowl, Williams played three seasons as the wicket-keeper for the Rest of Leeward Islands side that competed during Antigua and Barbuda's period as a separate team. His highest score for the Leewards was 42, made against the Windward Islands in the 2003–04 Carib Beer Cup. In 2006, Williams also played a match for Saint Kitts in the Stanford 20/20, against Nevis.

References

External links
Player profile and statistics at CricketArchive
Player profile and statistics at ESPNcricinfo

1976 births
Living people
Kittitian cricketers
Leeward Islands cricketers
Rest of Leeward Islands cricketers